School choice is a term for education options that allow students and families to select alternatives to public schools. It is the subject of fierce debate in various state legislatures across the United States. 

The most common in the United States, by both the number of programs and by the number of participating students are scholarship tax credit programs, which allow individuals or corporations to receive tax credits toward their state taxes in exchange for donations made to non-profit organizations that grant private school scholarships. A similar subsidy may be provided by a state through a school voucher program.

Other school choice options include open enrollment laws (which allow students to attend public schools other than their neighborhood school), charter schools, magnet schools, virtual schools, homeschooling, education savings accounts (ESAs), and individual education tax credits or deductions.

History

In the United States
In 1955, economist Milton Friedman proposed using free market principles to improve the United States public school system. The typical practice at that time was to assign children to the public school nearest their home. Friedman proposed that parents should be able to receive education funds in the form of school vouchers, which would allow them to choose their children's schools from among public, private, and religious and non-religious options.

Virginia's 1956 Stanley Plan used vouchers to finance white-only private schools known as segregation academies. Other states followed until the practice was disallowed by Griffin v. County School Board of Prince Edward County (1964).

Milwaukee mayor John Norquist (D) and Wisconsin governor Tommy Thompson (R) initiated school vouchers in Milwaukee in 1990. Minnesota was the first state to have a charter school law and the nation's first charter school was City Academy High School, which opened in St. Paul, Minnesota, in 1992. California created its District of Choice program in 1993. It allows California public school district to enroll students abiding outside district lines. 

In 1995, Friedman slammed the public school system for its “dismal results: some relatively good government schools in high-income suburbs and communities; very poor government schools in our inner cities.” In 1996, Friedman and his wife, Rose Friedman, founded the Friedman Foundation for Educational Choice (later EdChoice).

In Zelman v. Simmons-Harris in 2002, the Supreme Court of the United States declared that school vouchers could be used to pay for education in sectarian schools without violating the Establishment Clause of the First Amendment. As a result, states are free to enact voucher programs that provide funding for any school of the parent's choosing. 

In 2004, Congress enacted the D.C. Opportunity Scholarship Program, which provided scholarships to 2000 low-income students. In 2008, students came from families with an average income of $22,736, approximately 107 percent of the federal poverty level for a family of four.

In Iowa, the Educational Opportunities Act was enacted in 2006, creating tax credits for eligible donors to SGOs. These tax caps were $5 million originally, but in 2007 increased to $7.5 million. 

In  2007 Newark launched alternatives to poorly performing local schools. Governor Chris Christie worked with mayor Cory Booker to expand charter schools there.

By 2009 school choice had become a partisan issue. Democrat support waned, while Republican support continued to broaden. The Democratic-led Congress attempted to phase out the DC program, despite a waiting list of 9,000 low income children. The Obama administration provided funding incentives to states and school districts to increase the number of charter schools. In 2011 Republicans became the majority and renewed the program. In the 2009 and 2010 elections, school-choice-supporting Republicans gained seven governors’ seats. 12 states expanded school choice in 2011. Newly Republican states enacted half of that year's school-choice legislation.

In 2011  Wisconsin opened the Milwaukee program to all city students and introduced a similar plan in Racine. In 2013 vouchers were made available to qualifying families across Wisconsin, reaching more than 14,500 students in 2022. Also in 2011 Florida grew special-ed vouchers, simplified the rules that allowed students to transfer out of failing schools, and increased the cap on charter schools. Oklahoma created a tax-credit scholarship program for low-income students. Indiana removed the limit on charter schools, allowed universities to authorize charters, and established vouchers for low- and middle-income students. Arizona created ESAs for special-needs students. Ohio doubled the state’s scholarship program and increased scholarship/turoring funding for low-income students in Cleveland. Louisiana added scholarships for special-needs students. A poll found that 60 percent of American voters felt that tax credits support parents whereas 26 percent felt that tax credits support religion. 

The Arizona Individual Private School Tuition Tax Credit Program in 2014 offered $1,053 (individuals), and couples ($2,106). Nearly 24,000 children received scholarships in the 2011–2012 school year. The program started in 1998, reaching over 77,500 taxpayers, providing over $500 million in scholarship money for children at private schools across the state. The Arizona program survived a court challenge, ostensibly because tuition grants could go to religious schools. 

Greater Opportunities for Access to Learning is the Georgia program that offers a state income tax credit to donors of scholarships to private schools. Representative David Casas passed school choice legislation in Georgia.

About 1.8 million children were home educated in 2012. In 2014 a lawsuit sought to challenge the legality of the Florida voucher program.

In 2015, 14 cities had 30% or more of their students in charter schools, led by New Orleans, with 93% , 47 California school districts and 10,000 students participated in District of Choice, serving five percent of school districts and 0.2 percent of students.

In the 2020 Espinoza v. Montana Department of Revenue case, the Supreme Court ruled that states could not restrict voucher programs from religious schools simply because the school was run by a religious organization. The Court further ruled in Carson v. Makin that states could not restrict the use of vouchers against any secular private school as long as the parents had a choice of school, as this would violate the Free Exercise Clause.

By 2021 school choice students numbered 621,000, up from 200,000 in 2011. The next expansion was driven by pandemic-related dissatisfaction with public school policies and curricula. While many European school systems reopened in spring 2020, American public schools generally remained closed until the fall of 2021. For the 2020-2021 school year, public school enrollment fell by 3 percent. Private and charter schools grew an estimated 7 percent. 18 states either initiated school-choice programs or expanded offerings, making 3.6 million American students eligible for school choice and/or homeschool support programs. Several states expanded eligibility to include middle-class children.

Also in Florida directed ~$200 million to increased low-income scholarships, while raising the income cap to $100,000, to reach an estimated 60,000 more students. In June 2021 New Hampshire established ESAs, with an income cap of $79,500. By November, New Hampshire 1,600 students had applied. In 2018-19 in West Virginia, teachers fought a charter expansion, twice launching strikes. In 2020 Republicans won a state legislative supermajority and offered ESAs to students of all incomes.

In 2022 Alabama increased scholarship funding by 50%, to $30B. South Dakota expanded tax-credit scholarships. As of May 2022, 72% of US school parents favored vouchers, 76% supported ESAs, and 71% favored charter schools in the United States.

Forms

Scholarship tax credits 

Scholarship tax credit programs grant individuals and businesses a full or partial credit toward their taxes for donations made to scholarship granting organizations (SGOs; also called school tuition organizations). SGOs use the donations to create scholarships that allow students to attend private schools or out-of-district public schools. These programs currently exist in fourteen states: Alabama, Arizona, Florida, Georgia, Illinois, Iowa, Kansas, Louisiana, Minnesota, New Hampshire, Oklahoma, Pennsylvania, Rhode Island, and Virginia.

Vouchers 

Vouchers help pay for private school tuition, whether secular or religious.

Charter schools 

Charter schools are independent public schools that are exempt from many of the regulations governing public schools. These exemptions grant charter schools some autonomy and flexibility with decision-making, such as teacher contracts, hiring, and curriculum. In return, charter schools are subject to stricter accountability on spending and academic performance. Most states (and the District of Columbia) have charter school laws, though they vary in how charter schools are approved.

Magnet schools 

Magnet schools are public schools that specialize in science, technology, art or other specific areas. Magnet schools are not open to all children; some require a competitive examination. Magnet schools are an example of open enrollment programs, which refer to that allow families to choose public schools other than the ones they are assigned.

Homeschooling 

Home education or homeschooling is education provided at home, provided primarily by a parent or under direct parental control. Informal home education predates public schools, and formal instruction in the home has at times been popular. As public education grew during the 1900s, homeschooling dropped. Since 2000, the number of children educated at home has increased, particularly in the US. Laws relevant to home education differ: in some states, the parent needs to notify the state that the child is to be educated at home, while in others, at least one parent must be a certified teacher and annual progress reports are reviewed by the state.

Inter-district enrollment 

Intra-district open enrollment programs allow school choice within a district, while inter-district open enrollment allows families to choose schools outside the district.

To participate in California's District of Choice program, district governing boards declare themselves a District of Choice and set a quota for how many students to accept. School districts cannot discriminate among students, but can limit the number through a lottery system.

Education Savings Accounts 

ESAs allow parents to receive a public funds in a government-authorized savings account. These funds are often distributed in the form of a debit card that can be used to pay for various services, such as private school tuition and fees, online programs, private tutoring, community college costs, higher education services, and other approved learning materials and services. ESAs can pay for a combination of public school courses and private services.

Tax credit/deduction 

Some states allow parents to claim a tax credit or deduction to help fund certain educational expenses. These can include private school tuition, textbooks, school supplies and equipment, tutoring, and transportation.

Some other jurisdictions reduce the income tax for parents, so educational expenses can be more economical, which include private school tuition, supplies, computers, books, tutors, and transportation.

Online learning 

Online learning allows students to work with teachers and their courses over the internet.

Composites 

Course choice programs, public school courses, and special education therapies can be integrated into a student's curriculum, potentially with hybrid funding.

Debate

Support

Parental influence 
School choice gives parents more influence over what students learn (e.g., academics vs trades) and the learning environment (e.g., discipline, uniforms, extra-curriculars).

Student achievement 
Caroline Hoxby suggested that competition among schools increases student achievement. Supporters say this would level the playing field by broadening opportunities for low-income students—particularly minorities—to attend high-quality schools that would otherwise be accessible only to higher-income families.

Competition 
Voucher supporters argue that choice creates competition between schools, and that failing schools can lose students and close. Competition encourages schools to create innovative programs, become more responsive to parental demands, and increase student achievement. Competition can help parents influence their child's education. Parents can also punish ineffective schools by transferring their children elsewhere. Traditional public schools also have to compete, although even the least effective are rarely closed.

Cost effectiveness 
Studies undertaken by the Cato Institute and other libertarian and conservative think tanks claim that privately run education costs less (and produces superior outcomes).

Mental health 
One study reported that states that adopted charter school laws experienced a decline in adolescent suicides, and that private schooling reduces the likelihood of adults reporting mental health issues. School choice supporters claim that it can reduce bullying since families could choose to send their kids to a different school if they are experiencing bullying.

Rights 
According to The Organisation Internationale pour le Droit à l'Education et la Liberté d'Enseignement (OIDEL) the right to education is a human right and parents should be able to choose a school for their children without discrimination on the basis of finances. To advance freedom of education, OIDEL promotes a greater parity between public and private schooling systems.

In the United States, support for school choice has been paired with "parental rights". For example, Virginia Governor Glenn Youngkin asserted that he won his 2021 race by emphasizing that parents have the right to make decisions about their children’s education and supported school choice.

Housing prices 
One study reported that school choice programs reduce housing prices in high-performing districts more than in low-performing districts.

Oppose

Profiteering 
School choice measures are criticized as encouraging profiteering. Charter authorization organizations have non-profit status; and contract with related for-profit entities. Charters have been accused of creating units that charge them high rent, and that while the facilities are used as schools, they pay no property taxes.

Constitutionality 
Some school choice measures are criticized as violating church-state separation. The constitutionality of state-sponsored school choice laws has been challenged by school board associations, public school districts, teacher unions, associations of school business officials, the American Civil Liberties Union, the Freedom From Religion Foundation, and People for the American Way.

Destruction of public system 
School choice has been criticized for aiming to privatize schooling.

International overview

Belgium 

The Flemish community of Belgium has a high-performing education system as measured by PISA scores. Most private schools are subject to government targets and inspections. Schools are not allowed to select students via admissions tests, performance, religious background, or gender. The Flemish education system allows choice between teaching styles and competition, while suffering from relatively high socio-economic segregation.

Sweden 

Sweden's system of school choice is one of the world's freest, providing public funds for student choice of publicly or privately run school, including religious and for-profit schools. Fifteen years after the 1993 reform, private school enrollment had increased from 1% to 10% of the student population.

Chile 

In Chile, researchers reported that when controlling  for student background (parental income and education), the difference in performance between public and private sectors is not significant. Variation within each sector is greater than that between the two systems.

See also 
 School voucher
 Tax choice

References

Competition (economics)
Education economics
Education policy